The following is a list of programs airing on Retro TV.

Shows currently airing

As of 2023, based upon recent program guide.

 The Adventures of Dudley the Dragon
 The Adventures of Kit Carson*
 The Adventures of Ozzie and Harriet*
 Animal Rescue*
 Annie Oakley*
 The Barbara Stanwyck Show
 The Barkleys
 The Beverly Hillbillies* (also airs on MeTV)
 Biz Kid$
 The Border
 The Campbells
 Captain Isotope and the Enemy of Space
 Cliffhangers
 Cold Squad
 DaVinci's Inquest
 Disasters of the Century
 Doctor Who
 The Doctors
 Dog Tales
 DragonflyTV
 Dusty's Trail*
 Escape from Jupiter
 Four Star Playhouse*
 Follow That Man*
 The Genie from Down Under
 The Girl from Tomorrow
 Heartland
 Hot Wheels
 The Houndcats
 I Married Joan*
 The Indian Doctor
 Intelligence
 The Jerry Lewis Show
 The Joey Bishop Show (also airs on Antenna TV) 
 Legacy of the Silver Shadow
 Life with Elizabeth*
 Lock-Up
 The Lone Ranger* (also airs on FETV and The Cowboy Channel) 
 The Lucy Show*
 Man with a Camera
 Merv Griffin's Crosswords
 The Millionaire (also airs on Decades) 
 Mister Peepers
 Murdoch Mysteries
 Mustard Pancakes
 Naked City
 Off Beat Cinema
 One Step Beyond*
 Petticoat Junction*
 The Public Defender
 Police Surgeon
 Racket Squad*
 The Ray Bradbury Theater
 The Red Skelton Show*
 Republic of Doyle
 Rocket Robin Hood
 Route 66
 The Roy Rogers Show* (also airs on The Cowboy Channel) 
 Sherlock Holmes
 Shotgun Slade*
 Sky Trackers
 Soupy Sales
 Spellbinder
 Superman*
 Susie*
 Think Big
 The Trouble with Father*
 Victory at Sea*

* Program is sourced from episodes in the public domain in the United States.

Film presentations
 Festival of Fear
 Horror Hotel (hosted sci-fi and horror)
 Off Beat Cinema
 Retro Drive-In
 Six-Gun Theater
 Who Dun It Theater

Formerly aired

 Acorn TV
 Adam-12 (now on MeTV) 
 The Adventures of Ellery Queen
 Alias Smith and Jones
 Alfred Hitchcock Presents (now airs on MeTV) 
 Airwolf
 The A-Team (now on Cozi TV and MeTV)
 Baa Baa Black Sheep
 Bachelor Father
 The Barbara Stanwyck Show
 Battlestar Galactica
 Bonanza (public domain episodes)
 The Bold Ones
 The Brady Bunch (now on MeTV) 
 Buck Rogers
 Buck Rogers in the 25th Century
 Crusade in Europe
 The Collector
 Dangerous Assignment
 Delvecchio
 Dione Lucas
 Dragnet (1950s version) (now on MeTV) 
 Emergency! (now on Cozi TV) 
 Fishtronaut
 Flash Gordon
 Get Smart
 The Green Hornet
 Gunsmoke (now on TV Land, INSP and MeTV) 
 Happy Days
 The Hardy Boys/Nancy Drew Mysteries
 Harry and the Hendersons
 Have Gun – Will Travel (now on MeTV) 
 Haven
 Hip Hop Harry
 I Spy
 The Incredible Hulk 
 Ironside
 It Takes a Thief
 The Jack Benny Program (now on Antenna TV)
 Judge Roy Bean
 Kate %26 Allie
 Knight Rider
 Kojak
 Kraft Suspense Theatre
 Laredo (now airs on GetTV)
 Leave It To Beaver (now airs on MeTV) 
 Magnum, P.I. (now airs on Hallmark Movies & Mysteries)
 Marcus Welby, M.D.
 McHale%27s Navy (now on Antenna TV) 
 Mickey Spillane's Mike Hammer
 The Misadventures of Sheriff Lobo
 Mork & Mindy (now airs on Rewind TV)
 Mr. and Mrs. North
 Movin' On
 The Munsters Today
 My Bedbugs
 My Little Margie
 Mystery Science Theater 3000 (now on IFC and Z Living)
 The New Zorro
 Night Gallery (now airs on MeTV) 
 O'Hara, U.S. Treasury
 Perry Mason (now on MeTV) 
 Peter Gunn (now airs on MeTV) 
 Quincy, M.E.
 Rawhide (now on MeTV) 
 The Rockford Files
 Run for Your Life
 Sarge
 Simon & Simon
 Tales of the Wizard of Oz
 That's Incredible!
 The Virginian (now airs on MeTV) 
 Voyagers!
 Wagon Train (now on MeTV) 
 Wild America
 Wild Wild West (now airs on MeTV)

References

Retro Television Network
Retro TV